The Great Barrier Reef is the world's largest coral reef system off the coast of Australia.

Great Barrier Reef may also refer to:

Places
Great Barrier Reef Airport, an airport in Queensland
Great Barrier Reef Marine Park, a marine protected area

Arts and entertainment
Great Barrier Reef (2012 TV series), with Monty Halls
Great Barrier Reef (2015 TV series), with David Attenborough
The Great Barrier Reef: Biology, Environment and Management, a 2007 non-fiction book by Pat Hutchings, Mike Kingsford, and Ove Hoegh-Guldberg

See also

Barrier reef (disambiguation)
Barrier Reef (TV series)
GBR (disambiguation)
Great Barrier (disambiguation)